Danco may refer to:

Suzanne Danco, Belgian operatic singer
9812 Danco, an asteroid
Danco Laboratories - A pharmaceutical company in New York that distributes Mifeprex (RU-486)